Glyphocistis is a monotypic snout moth genus described by André Blanchard in 1973. Its only species, Glyphocistis viridivallis, described in the same article, is found in the US state of Texas.

The wingspan is 21–24 mm. The forewings are slate gray with dark-gray, white-tipped scales. The hindwings are pale yellowish white.

References

Phycitinae
Monotypic moth genera
Moths of North America